The Norfolk State Spartans baseball team is the varsity intercollegiate athletic team of the Norfolk State University in Norfolk, Virginia, United States. The team competes in the National Collegiate Athletic Association's Division I and is a member of the Northeast Conference (NEC). Through the 2022 season, the Spartans had competed in the school's full-time home of the Mid-Eastern Athletic Conference (MEAC), but after that season, the MEAC merged its baseball league into that of the NEC. Norfolk State and the three other MEAC members that sponsored baseball became NEC associate members in that sport.

The Spartans have been to one NCAA tournament in 2021. In 2021, the Spartans won their first MEAC Baseball tournament championship.

Stadiums

Marty L. Miller Field

Marty L. Miller Field is a baseball stadium in Norfolk, Virginia. The venue is named for former Norfolk State baseball coach Marty Miller. Built in 1997, it has a capacity of 1,500 spectators.

Head coaches

NCAA tournament

References

External links